The River Valley Local School district (abbreviated RVLSD) is a public school district serving students in and around the village of Caledonia in Marion County, Ohio, United States. As of June 2020, the superintendent of the schools is Mr. Adam Wickham. As of October 2017, the school district enrolls 1,934 students. In addition to Caledonia, the school district includes the communities of Claridon, Martel, Waldo, and eastern Marion.

Schools

Elementary schools
Heritage Elementary School (Grades K through 5th)
Liberty Elementary School (Grades K through 5th)

Middle schools
River Valley Middle School (Grades 6th through 8th)

High schools
River Valley High School (Grades 9th through 12th)

History
The River Valley Local School District was founded in 1964 when the River Valley High School and Junior High School were created, along with adding Caledonia Elementary School, Claridon Elementary School, Martel Elementary School, and Waldo Elementary School to the district. Martel Elementary School was closed in the 1980s and remaining students from that community began attending Caledonia Elementary. In 2003 the new high school, middle school, and 2 elementary campuses were completed in new locations. Currently there are only two elementary schools - Heritage Elementary and Liberty Elementary. The Waldo, Claridon, and Caledonia elementary buildings have since been demolished for community safety purposes.

References

External links
River Valley Local School District website

School districts in Ohio
Education in Marion County, Ohio
School districts established in 1964